Isoschizomers are pairs of restriction enzymes specific to the same recognition sequence. For example, SphI (CGTAC/G) and BbuI (CGTAC/G) are isoschizomers of each other. The first enzyme discovered which recognizes a given sequence is known as the prototype; all subsequently identified enzymes that recognize that sequence are isoschizomers. Isoschizomers are isolated from different strains of bacteria and therefore may require different reaction conditions.

In some cases, only one out of a pair of isoschizomers can recognize both the methylated as well as unmethylated forms of restriction sites. In contrast, the other restriction enzyme can recognize only the unmethylated form of the restriction site.
This property of some isoschizomers allows identification of methylation state of the restriction site while isolating it from a bacterial strain.
For example, the restriction enzymes HpaII and MspI are isoschizomers, as they both recognize the sequence 5'-CCGG-3' when it is unmethylated. But when the second C of the sequence is methylated, only MspI can recognize it while HpaII cannot.

An enzyme that recognizes the same sequence but cuts it differently is a neoschizomer.  Neoschizomers are a specific type (subset) of isoschizomer. For example, SmaI (CCC/GGG) and XmaI (C/CCGGG) are neoschizomers of each other. Similarly KpnI (GGTAC/C) and Acc65I (G/GTACC) are neoschizomers of each other. 
An enzyme that recognizes a slightly different sequence, but produces the same ends is an isocaudomer.

References

See also

Molecular biology
Biotechnology
Restriction enzymes